Ilya Kazakov may refer to:
 Ilya Kazakov (footballer) (born 1978), Russian footballer
 Ilya Kazakov (journalist) (born 1972), Russian football commentator, TV presenter and journalist